Ğayaz İsxaqıy aka Ayaz İshaki (Gajaz Ishaki - born Möxämmätğayaz; 10 February 1878 — 22 July 1954) was a leading figure of the Tatar national movement, author, journalist, publisher and politician. His daughter was the Turkologist Saadet Çagatay.

Biography 
Möxämmätğayaz İsxaqıy was born in 1878 in the village of Yaushirma near Kazan to a Mishar Tatar parents, father Ğiläcetdin and mother Qamäriyä. İshaki was home-schooled by his father at an early age and was sent to study in a madrasah (religious school). He continued his education in the Russian-Tatar teachers' school (1898–1902).

İshaki moved to Kazan in 1904, where he became acquainted to socialists and adopted some of their views. He became involved in revolutionary activities, participated in all-Muslim congress in 1905 and subsequently was arrested and sent to a prison near the city of Arkhangelsk in northern Russia in 1907.

After the February revolution of 1917 he was involved in activities aimed at achieving cultural autonomy for the Volga Tatars and other Turkic peoples of Russia. As a result of his activities, the Soviet authorities started a campaign of harassment and persecution against him and his associates. He was forced to emigrate in 1920. After settling in Germany, Gayaz Iskhaki started publishing a Tatar-language magazine "Milli Yul" ("The Way of the Nation") in 1928. In 1931 he presided over the Independence Committee of the Muslims in Idel Ural. 

In 1939 the magazine was closed and İshaki decided to immigrate to Turkey. After World War II he became involved in political activities. At this stage his main goal was the restoration of the Tatar nationhood lost in 1552 when the Kazan Khanate was defeated and occupied by the Moscow Principality.

Throughout his life İshaki traveled to Poland, Germany, Japan, China and Turkey where he tried to establish Tatar-language press and unite disparate Tatar emigree communities.

Ğayaz İshaki died in 1954 and was buried in Edirnekapı graveyard of Istanbul.

Bibliography 
 İsxaqıy, Ğayaz. Äsärlär unbiş tomda. Edited by M. Kh. (Mansur Khasanovich) Khasanov. Kazan: Tatarstan kitap näşriäte, 1998.
 Kamaliyeva, Alsu. Romantik Milliyetçi Ayaz İshakî. Ankara: Yayınları, 2009.
 Muhammed Ayaz İshaki: Hayatı Ve Faaliyeti, 100. Doğum Yılı Dolayısıyla. Ankara: Ayyıldız Matbaası, 1979.
 Säxapov, Äxmät. Ğayaz İsxaqıy : načalny etap tvorčestva : monografija. Kazań: Master Line, 2003.
 ———. İshaki i tatarskaja literatura XX veka. Kazań: PIK Dom Piečati, 2003.
 Ахунов, Азат М. “Гаяз Исхаки «Кто он? Кто он, кто нашу нацию взрастил?»." Татарский мир, 2004, №3. https://web.archive.org/web/20180322003928/http://www.tatworld.ru/article.shtml?article=489&section=0&heading=0.
 Сахапов, Минахмет Ж. Золотая эпоха татарского ренессанса. Казань: Таткнигиздат, 2004.

References 

Mishar Tatars
Tatar dramatists and playwrights
Tatar poets
Turkish people of Tatar descent